This page includes a list of biblical proper names that start with B in English transcription. Some of the names are given with a proposed etymological meaning. For further information on the names included on the list, the reader may consult the sources listed below in the References and External Links.

A – B – C – D – E – F – G – H – I – J – K – L – M – N – O – P – Q – R – S – T – U – V – Y – Z

B
Baal, "owner" or "lord", also "husband" (as possessor of the wife); possessor, controller 
Baalah
Baalath
Baalath-Beer
Baal-berith
Baal

Baal-gad
Baal-hamon
Baal-hermon
Ball-hanan, the Lord is gracious
Baali
Baalim
Baalis, lord of joy, rules
Baal-meon
Baal-peor
Baal-perazim
Baal-shalisha
Baal-tamar
Baal-zebub
Baal-zephon
Baana, affliction
Baanah, son of grief
Baara
Baaseiah, Jehovah is bold
Baasha, boldness, offensive, he who lays waste
Babel, confusion; mixture gate of God
Babylon, Gate Of The Deity, anointment or consecration or confusion or mixing
Baca
Bahurim
Bajith
Bakbakkar, diligent searcher
Bakbuk, a flagon, hollow
Bakbukiah, wasted by Jehovah, effusion of Jehovah
Balaam, a pilgrim, devouring, lord of the people
Baladan
Balak
Bamah
Barabbas
Barachel, father of Elihu
Barachel of Ammon
Barachias
Barak
Barjesus, wise
Barjona
Barnabas
Barsabas
Bartholomew
Bartimeus
Baruch
Barzillai
Bashan
Bashemath
Bathsheba
Bathsuha
Bealiah
Bealoth
Bebai
Becher
Bechorath
Bedad
Bedaiah
Bedan
Beeliada
Beelzebub
Beer
Beera
Beerelim
Beeri
Beer-lahai-roi
Beeroth
Beersheba
Behemoth
Bekah
Belah
Belial
Belshazzar
Belteshazzar
Ben
Benaiah
Ben-ammi
Beneberak
Bene-jaakan
Benhadad
Benhail
Benhanan
Benjamin
Benimi
Beno
Benoni
Benzoheth
Beon, meaning uncertain
Beor 
Bera
Berachah
Berachiah
Beraiah
Berea
Bered
Beri
Beriah
Berith
Bernice
Berodach-baladan
Berothai
Berothath
Besai
Besodeiah
Besor
Betah
Beten
Bethabara
Bethanath
Bethany, House of Misery
Betharabah
Beth-aram
Betharbel (Hosea 10:14)
Beth-aven, in  It Is opposed to Beth-el 
Beth-azmaveth
Beth-baalmeon
Beth-barah
Beth-birei
Beth-car
Beth-dagon
Beth-diblathaim
Bethel
Bethemek
Bether
Bethesda
Beth-ezal
Beth-gader
Beth-gamul
Beth-haccerem
Beth-haran
Beth-horon
Beth-lebaoth
Beth-lehem
Beth-marcaboth
Beth-meon
Beth-millo, 2 Kings 12:21
Beth-nimrah
Beth-palet
Beth-pazzez
Beth-peor
Bethphage
Beth-phelet
Beth-rapha
Bethsaida
Bethshan
Beth-shemesh
Bethuel
Beth-zur
Betonim
Beulah
Bezai,
Bezaleel
Bezek
Bezer
Bichri
Bidkar
Bigthan
Bigvai
Bildad
Bileam
Bilgah
Bilhah
Bilshan
Binea
Binnui
Birsha,
Bishlam
Bithiah
Bithron
Bithynia
Bizjothjas
Blastus
Boanerges
Boaz
Bocheru
Bochim
Bohan, thumb or big toe
Boskath
Boson
Bozrah
Bukki
Bukkiah
Bul
Bunah
Bunni
Buz
Buzi

References
Comay, Joan, Who's Who in the Old Testament, Oxford University Press, 1971, 
Lockyer, Herbert, All the men of the Bible, Zondervan Publishing House (Grand Rapids, Michigan), 1958
Lockyer, Herbert, All the women of the Bible, Zondervan Publishing 1988, 
Lockyer, Herbert, All the Divine Names and Titles in the Bible, Zondervan Publishing 1988, 
Tischler, Nancy M., All things in the Bible: an encyclopedia of the biblical world , Greenwood Publishing, Westport, Conn. : 2006

Inline references

B